The W. P. Carey School of Business is the business school of Arizona State University and is one of the largest business schools in the United States, with over 300 faculty, and more than 1,582 graduate and 15,077 undergraduate students (2019-2020 enrollment). The school was named for William Polk Carey following his $50 million gift in 2003. In 2020, the W. P. Carey School was ranked 21st in the world for economics and business by Shanghai Jiao Tong University's Academic Ranking of World Universities. In 2020, U.S. News & World Report ranked 30 W. P. Carey academic disciplines in the top 25.

History
The school began as the Department of Commerce, offering business courses and curriculum to students interested in a business career. As the department expanded, Emil John Hilkert was tapped to serve as dean for six months, although Glenn D. Overman was accountable for establishing most of the College of Business programs and is generally recognized as the founding dean.

The school was endowed in 2003 with a $50 million pledge from the W. P. Carey Foundation. At the time, the $50 million pledge was the second-largest single donation to any U.S. business school, according to the Association to Advance Collegiate Schools of Business.

On October 29, 2011, the school commemorated the groundbreaking of McCord Hall, named for Arizona philanthropist Sharon Dupont McCord and the late Bob McCord. Opened in fall 2013, McCord Hall is a  facility, featuring more classrooms for graduate programs and undergraduate honors students, technologically advanced team rooms, a new career center, outdoor assembly areas, and the latest in environmental innovation.

The W. P. Carey School of Business is accredited by Association to Advance Collegiate Schools of Business (AACSB).

Programs

W. P. Carey offers two undergraduate degrees: a Bachelor of Science degree with option of 13 business majors and a Bachelor of Arts degree in Business with 23 major options. There are also 12 certificate options and two minors. The W. P. Carey undergraduate business program is ranked 24th in the nation overall by U.S. News & World Report. The online MBA is ranked No. 6, the Executive MBA 18th, and the Full-time MBA 30th. The W. P. Carey graduate programs office offers several different way for students to receive their Master's of Business Administration: Full-Time, Executive, Online, Part-time, and the new Fast-track program that allows students to receive an MBA in at little as nine months.

Professional development
In addition to the degree-granting programs, the W. P. Carey School offers executive education to broaden personal knowledge on business topics or develop a company's workforce.
 Custom Programs
 Leadership Development Workshops
 Supply Chain Management Certificate
 Real Estate Development Certificate
 Small Business Leadership Academy

Business research
In rankings from the journal Technovation, the W. P. Carey School ranks first among all business schools worldwide for authoring research in the Top 45 academic business journals with the most global impact. The rankings analyzed articles published in 2010 in the world's foremost journals for business.

The University of Texas at Dallas ranks the W. P. Carey School 25th in the world and 23rd in the U.S. for research productivity, based on research contributions between all journals. In a joint study by Texas A&M University and the University of Florida, the research productivity of the W. P. Carey Department of Management was ranked 3rd in North America for the years 2016-2020.

The W. P. Carey School of Business houses 12 research centers and seven research labs.

Research centers
 adidas and ASU Global Sport Alliance
 The Center for Advanced Procurement Strategy (CAPS Research)
 The Center for the Advanced Study in Economic Efficiency (CASEE)
 The Center for Competitiveness and Prosperity Research
 The Center for Entrepreneurship
 The Center for Environmental Economics and Sustainability Policy
 The Center for Investment Engineering
 The Center for Real Estate Theory and Practice
 The Center for Services Leadership (CSL)
 The Center for the Study of Economic Liberty
 The JPMorgan Chase Economic Outlook Center
 The L. William Seidman Research Institute

Research labs
 Actionable Analytics Lab
 Complex Adaptive Supply Networks Research Accelerator (CASN-RA)
 Digital Society Initiative
 Food and Agribusiness Lab
 Frontier Economies Logistics Lab
 Health Sector Supply Chain Research Consortium (HSRC-ASU)
 Internet Edge Supply Chain Lab

Notable people

Faculty
 Robert Cialdini – professor emeritus
 Angelo Kinicki – Weatherup/Overby Chair in Leadership; professor of management
 Rajnish Mehra – E. N. Basha Arizona Heritage Chair in Economics; professor of economics and finance
 Edward C. Prescott – W. P. Carey Chair, Economics; 2004 Nobel Memorial Prize in Economic Sciences winner

Alumni
 Michael J. Ahearn (B.S. Finance 1979) – CEO, First Solar
 Vince Ferraro (Master of Business Administration 1982) – VP of Global Strategy and Marketing, Eastman Kodak
 Mike Haynes (B.S. Finance 1982) – member, Pro Football Hall of Fame and College Football Hall of Fame; Vice President for Player Development, NFL
 Rex Maughan (B.S. Accountancy 1962) – Founder, president and CEO, Forever Living Products
 Jeff Quinney (B.S. Finance 2001) – professional golfer
 Pat Tillman (B.S. Marketing 1997) – former player, Arizona Cardinals; former corporal, US Army Rangers

See also
 List of United States business school rankings
 List of business schools in the United States

Gallery

References

External links
 

Business schools in Arizona
Arizona State University
Educational institutions established in 1961
The Washington Campus
1961 establishments in Arizona